The 2021–22 season was the 130th season in the existence of Club Brugge KV and the club's 62nd consecutive season in the top flight of Belgian football. In addition to the domestic league, Club Brugge participated in this season's editions of the Belgian Cup, the Belgian Super Cup, and the UEFA Champions League.

On 17 July 2021, Club Brugge won their first trophy of the season, defeating Genk in the 2021 Belgian Super Cup.

On 15 May 2022, Club Brugge secured their third consecutive and 18th overall league title in history with a 3–1 win in Antwerp.

Players

First-team squad

{{Fs player|no=14|nat=IRN|pos=FW|name=[[armin derhami]}

Out on loan

Transfers

In

Out

Pre-season and friendlies

Competitions

Overall record

First Division A

League table

Results summary

Results by round

Matches
The league fixtures were announced on 8 June 2021.

Play-Off I

Results summary

Results by round

Matches

Belgian Cup

Belgian Super Cup

UEFA Champions League

Group stage

The draw for the group stage was held on 26 August 2021.

Statistics

Squad appearances and goals
Last updated on 22 May 2022

|-
! colspan=14 style=background:#dcdcdc; text-align:center|Goalkeepers

|-
! colspan=14 style=background:#dcdcdc; text-align:center|Defenders

|-
! colspan=14 style=background:#dcdcdc; text-align:center|Midfielders

|-
! colspan=14 style=background:#dcdcdc; text-align:center|Forwards

|-
! colspan=14 style=background:#dcdcdc; text-align:center|Players who have made an appearance this season but have left the club

|}

Goal scorers

Clean sheets

References

Club Brugge KV seasons
Club Brugge
Club Brugge
Belgian football championship-winning seasons